The Çatalan Bridge, also known as the West Bridge, is a  long bridge crossing the Seyhan Dam Lake in Adana, Turkey. The bridge connects the city of Adana to the villages and vacation homes north of the lake. The Çatalan bridge was the longest bridge in Turkey from its construction in 1998 to 2007, when it was surpassed by Viaduct No. 1 near Bolu and the longest bridge crossing a body of water until 2016, when it was surpassed by the Osman Gazi Bridge near Gebze.

Construction was started in 1998 by a consortium of three companies: Lurgi Bamag, STFA and ALKE. The bridge opened to traffic on 17 June 2002.

External links
Çatalan Bridge

Bridges in Adana
Bridges over the Seyhan River
Bridges completed in 2002